The Mettur Dam is one of the largest dams in India and also the largest in Tamil Nadu, located across the river Kaveri where it enters the plains. Built in 1934, it took 9 years to complete. Maximum height and width of the dam are 214 and 171 feet, respectively. The dam receives inflows from its own catchment area, Kabini Dam and Krishna Raja Sagara Dams located in Karnataka. There is a park at the base of the dam called Ellis Park maintained by the Tamil Nadu Public Works Department. It provides irrigation and drinking water facilities for more than 12 districts of Tamil Nadu and hence is revered as the life and livelihood-giving asset of Tamil Nadu.

History
It was constructed under the supervision of an Irish engineer, Vincent Hart, who was also the chief engineer of the project. It took nine years and the effort of 17,000 men to complete the dam project. After the construction was complete, Mettur Dam over Kaveri became the largest dam in the world. The funds were provided from the taxes collected in the Madras Presidency. The Board of Revenue was headed by Sir C.P. Ramaswamy Iyer who initiated the building of the dam. As a result, the dam authorities evacuated the people of Nayambadi and some other villages where the dam was sited. When the water level of the reservoir recedes, even now old Christian Church of Nayamabadi and some Hindu temples from other villages emerge from it as proof. Those people who migrated from Nayambadi have settled down in Martalli, Cowdalli and other nearby villages in the Kollegal taluk of Chamarajanagar district of the state of Karnataka.

Capacity 

The dam creates Stanley Reservoir. The Mettur Hydro Electrical power project is also quite large. The dam, the park, the major hydroelectric power stations, and hills on all sides make Mettur a tourist attraction. Upstream from the dam is Hogenakkal Falls. Area of reservoir 42.5 square kilometer.

Water dispute

The Mettur Dam has received public attention since the latter half of the 20th century, and especially in the mid-1990s, due to the Kaveri River water dispute between the States of Tamil Nadu and Karnataka. Because of subsequent dams constructed across the Cauvery and its tributaries in Karnataka, namely Harangi Dam, Hemavathi Dam, Kabini Dam, following the KRS Dam; Mettur Dam does not receive much water during lean seasons. As a result, the dam nearly goes dry during certain periods of the year, often when water is most needed by the farmers and the general public of Tamil Nadu. This has created serious dispute and tension between the neighbouring states of Karnataka and Tamil Nadu. Governments of the respective states, the Supreme Court, and the Cauvery Tribunal have so far not been successful in resolving the dispute. The tribunal has specified an annual release of 192 tmcft by Karnataka to Tamil Nadu. In the years of deficit in realisation the dispute aggravates in both the states. The major reasons for the deficit are inadequate realisation of Southwest monsoon in the primary catchment areas of the river viz., Kodagu and Wayanad and the over reliance of the river water for irrigation and drinking water schemes in both the states.

Mettur Surplus Water Scheme 
Mettur Surplus Water Scheme (Also called Sarabanga Lift irrigation project) was announced in the year 2019 by then Chief Minister Edappadi K. Palaniswami at the cost of Rs. 545 crores. The scheme aimed at diverting surplus flood waters released from Mettur dam into 100 dry lakes in the region & use the water for irrigational & drinking water purposes.

When Mettur dam gets filled, the water from the dam is taken to Thimmampatti pump house via canals. Thimmampatti pump house contains two sections, one with ten 940 HP motors & other with six 1080 HP motors. These sections will pump excess water to M.Kallipatti lake & Nangavalli lake respectively via pipelines. The water discharge from M.Kallipatti & Nangavalli lake is anticipated to fill multiple lakes & ponds. Another Pumping station planned near M.Kallipatti lake will pump water to 42 lakes through Vellalapuram and Kannantheri.

The scheme is expected to support agriculture in 4,238 acres of land in 40 villages & provide drinking water to 38 villages. The project got inaugurated in February 2021

Gallery

See also

Banasura Sagar Dam
Stanley Reservoir
Krishna Raja Sagara
Grand Anicut

Notes

External links

 Metturdam.Com 
 metturtravels.com 
 Mettur.Com 
 Ministry of Water Resources – Government of India
 
 Water released from Mettur dam
 Photograph

Dams in Tamil Nadu
Kaveri River
Salem district
Hydroelectric power stations in Tamil Nadu
Dams completed in 1934
Dams on the Kaveri River
1934 establishments in India
Tourist attractions in Salem district
20th-century architecture in India